Milenko Kovačević (Serbian Cyrillic: Миленко Ковачевић; 6 November 1963 – 23 April 2022) was a professional footballer who played as a midfielder for clubs in Yugoslavia, Greece and Cyprus.

Club career
Kovačević began playing football with FK Rad in the Yugoslav First League.

Kovačević moved to Greece in July 1992, where he played for Greek first division side Apollon Athens F.C.|Apollon Athens, making 93 appearances during his three seasons in the Greek top flight.

Kovačević finished his playing career in Cyprus with AEK Larnaca and Nea Salamis Famagusta.

References

1963 births
2022 deaths
Sportspeople from Šabac
Serbian footballers
Association football midfielders
Super League Greece players
Cypriot First Division players
FK Mačva Šabac players
FK Rad players
Apollon Smyrnis F.C. players
AEK Larnaca FC players
Nea Salamis Famagusta FC players
Serbian expatriate footballers
Serbian expatriate sportspeople in Greece
Expatriate footballers in Greece
Serbian expatriate sportspeople in Cyprus
Expatriate footballers in Cyprus